Tobias Tuvia Lewenstein (1863–1952) was Chief Rabbi of Jewish communities in the Netherlands, Denmark, and Switzerland in the late 19th and early 20th centuries.

He was born in Paramaribo, Surinam, to Mozes Judah Lewenstein (1829–1864) and Francisca Fransje Fradche Koetser (b. 1839). His father was chief rabbi of Paramaribo. After his father's death in 1864, Lewenstein's family returned to Leiden in The Netherlands to live with his mother's sister and uncle. The family later moved to Amsterdam where Lewenstein began his rabbinical studies at the  before studying at the Hildesheimer Rabbinical Seminary in Berlin and then earning his doctorate at the University of Halle in Germany. In 1895, he returned to the Netherlands to serve as chief rabbi in Leeuwarden and then, in 1899, he became chief rabbi in The Hague.

On 1 May 1903, he was selected by Copenhagen's  to succeed David Simonsen as chief rabbi of Denmark. His term there was contentious due to his opposition to interfaith marriage, allowing children born of Jewish fathers and non-Jewish mothers to convert, and participation in a Danish ecumenical national day of prayer, among other issues, and he was removed from the post on 18 January 1910. Because Lewenstein's contract stated the position was a lifetime appointment, his dismissal sparked a legal battle that ended up before the Danish Supreme Court. In the end, Lewenstein was awarded in 1912 .

He remained as the chief rabbi there until 1940. From 1919 to 1923, he also served as president of World Agudath Israel. In 1945, he returned to The Hague for a brief time to help the Dutch Jewish community rebuild after World War II.

In 1895, Lewenstein married Flora Frumet Møller (1873–1945), the daughter of Alexander Møller and Therese Telzche Heymann.

Reference 

1863 births
1953 deaths
Chief rabbis of Denmark
Chief rabbis of the Netherlands
19th-century Jewish theologians
Dutch Jews